NGC 7068 is a spiral galaxy located about 215 million light-years away in the constellation of Pegasus. NGC 7068 was discovered by astronomer Albert Marth on November 7, 1863.

On June 26, 2013 a type 1a supernova designated as SN 2013ei was discovered in NGC 7068.

References

External links 

Spiral galaxies
Pegasus (constellation)
7068
66765
Astronomical objects discovered in 1863